Diamond Oak Bridge is a concrete bridge across the River South Tyne near Coanwood in Northumberland.

History
The bridge links Coanwood on the east of the River Tyne and Lambley on the west and was completed in 1975. Although designed to remain open in all weathers, it is often impassible under snow conditions.

References

Bridges in Northumberland
Crossings of the River Tyne